Seduced and Abandoned is a 1964 Italian film directed by Pietro Germi. It was screened at the 1964 Cannes Film Festival.

Plot
The film presents the tale of Agnese Ascalone, daughter of prominent quarry owner Vincenzo Ascalone, and takes place in a small town in Sicily (specifically Sciacca), as did Germi's previous film, Divorce, Italian Style. Agnese is seduced by her sister Matilde's fiancé, and has a tryst with him for which she confesses and tries to repent, only to be discovered by her mother and father. Vincenzo immediately demands that the man, Peppino Califano, marry his daughter, and antics ensue. The film is a dark satire of Sicilian social customs and honor laws, and is very similar to Divorce, Italian Style.

Cast
 Stefania Sandrelli - Agnese Ascalone
 Saro Urzì - Don Vincenzo Ascalone
 Aldo Puglisi - Peppino Califano
 Lando Buzzanca - Antonio Ascalone
 Lola Braccini - Amalia Califano
 Leopoldo Trieste - Baron Rizieri Zappalà
 Umberto Spadaro - Cousin Ascalone, a lawyer
 Paola Biggio - Matilde Ascalone
 Rocco D'Assunta - Orlando Califano
 Oreste Palella - Police Chief Polenza
 Lina Lagalla - Francesca Ascalone
 Gustavo D'Arpe - Ciarpetta the Lawyer
 Rosetta Urzì - Consolata the Maid
 Roberta Narbonne - Rosaura Ascalone
 Vincenzo Licata - Pasquale Profumo the Undertaker
 Attilio Martella - The Magistrate Judge
 Adelino Campardo - Police Officer Bisigato
 Salvatore Fazio - Don Mariano the Priest
 Italia Spadaro - Aunt Carmela

Context
These Sicilian customs, including a form of bride kidnapping or elopement known as fuitina and the following "rehabilitating marriage" (matrimonio riparatore), were brought to national attention in 1966 by the case of Franca Viola. Her story was turned into the 1970 film, La moglie più bella (The Most Beautiful Wife) by Damiano Damiani and starring Ornella Muti.

See also
Bride kidnapping in films

References

External links

Seduced and Abandoned: Honor and Family an essay by Irene Bignardi at the Criterion Collection

1964 films
1964 comedy films
1960s Italian-language films
Italian black-and-white films
Commedia all'italiana
Films directed by Pietro Germi
Films scored by Carlo Rustichelli
Films with screenplays by Luciano Vincenzoni
Films with screenplays by Age & Scarpelli
Films set in Sicily
1960s Italian films